Vee Vee is the second studio album by the American indie rock band Archers of Loaf, released in March 1995 by Alias Records. The album received very positive reviews from critics.

Recording and release
Vee Vee was recorded in Chicago, Illinois, in August 1994 and produced by the band and Bob Weston. It was released in March 1995 by the independent record label Alias Records. "Harnessed in Slums" was released as the album's single, and it got considerable airplay on college and alternative rock radio stations. A 2-disc reissue of the album, containing several rarities, demos, and B-sides, was released on February 21, 2012, by Merge Records.

Critical reception

Vee Vee received very positive reviews from critics. Writing for Spin, Natasha Stovall praised Eric Bachmann's honest singing, stating that his "hoary, nasal desperation embodies Vee Vees subtle mix of motivations." In a retrospective review, Gregory Heaney of AllMusic said that the album "found Archers of Loaf proving time and time again that what really matters in music is heart, sweat, and grit, and that if you have those on your side, everything else just kind of falls into place."

Track listing
All songs written by Archers of Loaf, except where noted.
 "Step into the Light" (Mark Griffiths) – 4:22
 "Harnessed in Slums" – 3:16
 "Nevermind the Enemy" – 2:31
 "Greatest of All Time" – 3:51
 "Underdogs of Nipomo" – 3:31
 "Floating Friends" – 3:48
 "1985" – 0:52
 "Fabricoh" – 3:05
 "Nostalgia" – 1:18
 "Let the Loser Melt" – 3:32
 "Death in the Park" – 3:30
 "The Worst Has Yet to Come" – 2:50
 "Underachievers March and Fight Song" – 3:03

Personnel
Eric Bachmann – vocals, guitar
Matt Gentling – bass
Eric Johnson – guitar
Mark Price – drums
Bob Weston – engineer

References

External links

1995 albums
Alias Records albums
Archers of Loaf albums
Merge Records albums
Albums produced by Bob Weston